Conal P. Groom (born May 16, 1973) was, in September 2010, the head coach at Seattle Rowing Center, a rowing club devoted to youth through elite development on Lake Washington's Ship Canal in Seattle, Washington. He was hired as head coach at Lake Union Crew, another Seattle rowing club, until he left in July 2010. Before his employment at Lake Union Crew, he was director and an elite coach at Pocock Rowing Center. He co-founded Seattle Rowing Center with Carol Nagy, the former junior novice coach at Lake Union Crew and business manager at Pocock Rowing Center. He attended Berkshire School and attended Georgetown University, where he rowed on the varsity crew team.

Olympic rowing
Groom has placed as high as third in world championship competition (lightweight quadruple sculls, 1998), and he and Steve Tucker placed sixth in the 1999 World Championships. Groom and Tucker competed at the 2000 Summer Olympics, finishing 11th in the lightweight double sculls.

Controversies 
As of March 14, 2022, Groom is under investigation by USRowing for allegations of sexual misconduct and is prohibited from coaching or interacting with minors.

References

1973 births
Georgetown University alumni
Georgetown Hoyas rowers
Living people
Olympic rowers of the United States
Sportspeople from New Haven, Connecticut
Rowers at the 2000 Summer Olympics
Rowing coaches
American male rowers
Berkshire School alumni
Pan American Games medalists in rowing
Pan American Games bronze medalists for the United States
World Rowing Championships medalists for the United States
Rowers at the 2003 Pan American Games
Medalists at the 2003 Pan American Games